Claes Norström (born 4 April 1959) is a retired Swedish ice hockey player. Norström was part of the Djurgården Swedish champions' team of 1989. Norström made 91 Elitserien appearances for Djurgården.

References

1959 births
Djurgårdens IF Hockey players
Living people
Swedish ice hockey players